Woodlawn Cemetery is a cemetery located at 19975 Woodward Avenue, opposite the former Michigan State Fairgrounds, between 7 Mile Road and 8 Mile Road, in Detroit, Michigan.

History
The cemetery was established in 1895 and immediately attracted some of the most notable names in the city.  The grounds encompass  and were planned by civil engineer Mason L. Brown and horticulturalist Frank Eurich.  At the time of the first burial in 1896, Woodlawn was outside the city limits.  Eurich also developed Woodlawn Cemetery in Toledo.

Notable burials 
 Rev. James Lofton Sr. (1911-1973)- Founder and Pastor of "Church of Our Prayer" in Detroit Michigan 
 Waldo Avery (1858–1914) – founder of United States Gypsum
 Bella Marshall Barden (1950–2012) – wife of Don H. Barden and Wayne County Chief Operating Officer
 Edgar Albert Guest (1881-1959) – American Poet known as the People's poet 
 Don H. Barden (1943–2011) – Casino Gaming and Cable Television Entrepreneur
 Renaldo "Obie" Benson (1937–2005) –  Member of Motown's Four Tops
 Roy D. Chapin (1880–1936) – Industrialist, automaker and U.S. Secretary of Commerce
 Albert Cobo (1893–1957) – Mayor of Detroit
 Howard A. Coffin (1877–1956) – Congressman
 John Blaisdell Corliss (1851–1929) Attorney, Congressman and father-in-law of George M. Holley
 James J. Couzens (1872–1936 ) – U.S. Senator and Mayor of Detroit
 Edgar Culbertson (1935–1967) – U.S. Coast Guardsman and recipient of the Coast Guard Medal

 Anna Thompson Dodge (1866–1970) – Widow of Horace Dodge and philanthropist
 Horace Elgin Dodge (1868–1920) – Businessman and co-founder of Dodge Motors
 John Francis Dodge (1864–1920) – Businessman and co-founder of Dodge Motors
 George Duffield, Jr. (1818–1888) – Presbyterian minister and composer of Stand Up, Stand Up for Jesus
 Dee Edwards (1945–2006) – Soul singer
 Daisy Elliott (1917–2015) – Author and Co-sponsor of Elliott-Larsen Civil Rights Act, Delegate to 1961–62 Constitution of Michigan convention and Michigan State Representative
 Homer S. Ferguson (1889–1982) – U.S. Senator, judge and diplomat
 Edsel Ford (1893–1943) – Ford Motor Company president and son of Henry Ford
 Eleanor Clay Ford (1896–1976) – Wife of Edsel Ford and niece of retailer J. L. Hudson
 William Clay Ford, Sr. (1925–2014) – grandchild of Henry Ford
 Aretha Franklin (1942–2018), Gospel and Rhythm & Blues (R&B) singer known as The Queen of Soul 
 Clarence L. (C.L.) Franklin (1915–1984) – Baptist minister and father of singers Aretha Franklin, Carolyn Franklin and Erma Franklin
Carolyn Franklin (1944–1988) – Gospel and R&B singer and younger sister of Aretha Franklin
Erma Franklin (1938–2002)  – Gospel and R&B singer and older sister of Aretha Franklin
 Harvey Fruehauf (1893–1968) – son of August Fruehauf and president of Fruehauf Trailer Corporation

 Susie Garrett (1929–2002) – Actress, star of Punky Brewster and sister of actress Marla Gibbs
 Alex Groesbeck (1873–1953) – Michigan Governor and Attorney General
 Major Edward Hartwick (1871-1918) – Military officer and lumberman
 Frank J. Hecker (1846–1927) – Railroad car manufacturer and business partner of art collector Charles Lang Freer
 Billy Henderson (1939–2007) – Lead singer of The Spinners
 George M. Holley Sr. (1878–1963) – Automotive engineer, designer and founder of Holley Carburetor
 DeShaun Dupree "Proof" Holton (1973–2006) – Rap musician
 Joseph L. Hudson (1846–1912) – Department store magnate
 James Jamerson (1938–1983) – Motown bass guitarist
 James (Prophet) Jones (1907–1971) – prominent national and local religious leader during the 1940s and 1950s who was the first African American televangelist of Detroit and founder of the Church of Universal Triumph, Dominion of God, Inc.
 Marv Johnson (1938–1993) – Motown/R&B singer
 Julanne Johnston (1900–1988) – Silent Film actress
 Ed Killian (1876–1928) – Major League Baseball pitcher
 Alfred Lucking (1856–1929) – Congressman
 Frederick C. Martindale (1865-1928) – Michigan Secretary of State
 Wade H. McCree (1920–1987) – Lawyer, judge, and U.S. Solicitor General
 Blair Moody (1902–1954) –  US Senator and newspaper reporter
 Elijah E. Myers (1832–1909) – Architect of the Colorado, Michigan and Texas State Capitols
 James K. Okubo (1920–1967) – World War II US Army recipient of the Medal of Honor
 Hazen Pingree (1840–1901) – Detroit Mayor and Michigan Governor
 Francis Petrus Paulus (1862-1933) — Artist, teacher, and trustee of the Detroit Museum of Art
 Rosa Parks (1913–2005) – Civil Rights activist
 Edward Patten (1939–2005) – Member of Gladys Knight & The Pips
 Lawrence Payton (1938–1997) – Member of Motown's Four Tops
 Barbara Randolph (1942–2002) – Motown/R&B singer
 David Ruffin (1941–1991) – Lead singer of The Temptations
Ed Siever (1875-1920) - Major League baseball pitcher
 Levi Stubbs (1936–2008) – Lead singer of Motown's Four Tops
 George W. Trendle (1884–1972) – Creator of The Lone Ranger and The Green Hornet
 Carl M. Weideman (1898–1972) – Congressman
 Ronald White (1938–1995) – Member of Motown's The Miracles
 Richard Storrs Willis (1819–1900) – Composer of It Came Upon a Midnight Clear and other hymns
 Earl Wilson (1934–2005) – Major League baseball pitcher
 Matilda Dodge Wilson – (1883–1967) Widow of John Dodge and Alfred Wilson, benefactor of Michigan State University –  now Oakland University and Detroit's Music Hall and Lieutenant Governor of Michigan
 Pop Winans (1934–2009) – gospel singer and patriarch of the gospel group the Winans family
 Ronald Winans (1956–2005) – gospel singer and member of the gospel group the Winans family
 There is one British Commonwealth war grave of a Canadian Private who served in World War I and died in 1919.

Bishop John Seth Bailey (1896-1984) First Assistant Presiding Bishop of the Church of God in Christ.

References

Sources 
 Kvaran, Einar Einarsson, Cemetery Sculpture in America, unpublished manuscript
 Nawrocki, Dennis Alan and Thomas J. Holleman, Art in Detroit Public Places, Wayne State University Press, Detroit, Michigan,  1980
 Northup, A. Dale, Detroit's Woodlawn Cemetery, Arcadia Publishing,  2003

External links 

 The Political Graveyard – Politicians buried in Woodlawn Cemetery
 Woodlawn Cemetery at Find A Grave
 Woodlawn Cemetery website

Cemeteries in Michigan
Geography of Detroit
Protected areas of Wayne County, Michigan
Tourist attractions in Detroit
1895 establishments in Michigan